Panruti S. Ramachandran (born 10 November 1937 in Panruti, Madras Presidency) is an Indian Tamil politician and former Member of the Legislative Assembly of Tamil Nadu.

He served as the party presidium chairman of DMDK till 2013.

Early life and education 

Ramachanrdran was born in a village named Puliyurkaattusaagai in Panruti taluk, Cuddalore District. He is the only son of Sankaradevan and Chinnapillai. He did his schooling in St. David High School at Cuddalore Old Town.

After SSLC, he joined Annamalai University for his PUC and later graduated in Electrical and Electronic Engineering (honours degree in B.E). Thereafter, he joined the Tamil Nadu Electricity Board as Assistant Engineer at Arni, North Arcot.

Politics 

Ramachandran was the Dravida Munnetra Kazhagam (DMK) student secretary while at Annamalai University. As a secretary, he organised DMK meetings at Arignar Anna would be the prime speaker. Anna was impressed by Ramachandran's government of Tamil Nadu he used to speak as Sampath in DMK public meetings. He named his son as Sampath after his pen name.

He started his political career as a DMK member. He was the Minister for Transport of Tamil Nadu during 1971–77. He later joined Anna Dravida Munnetra Kazhagam (ADMK). He has won six assembly elections contesting from Panruti constituency.

He was elected to the Tamil Nadu legislative assembly from Panruti constituency as a Dravida Munnetra Kazhagam candidate in 1967, and 1971 elections as an Anna Dravida Munnetra Kazhagam candidate in 1977, 1980, and 1984 elections and as a Pattali Makkal Katchi candidate in 1991 election.

The chairman of the Desiya Murpokku Dravida Kazhagam presidium and Deputy Leader of the Opposition in the Tamil Nadu Legislative Assembly, Ramachandran on 10 December 2013 announced retirement from active politics. In his letter addressed to DMDK founder-president Vijayakanth, he stated that he had taken the decision as he had been maintaining indifferent health and his doctor had advised him to take rest. He resigned from the DMDK and in February 2014 he joined the All India Anna Dravida Munnetra Kazhagam party. He blamed the abnormal distance formed between the DMDK and him. After that he spoke in many Constituencies for the AIADMK Victory in 16th Lok Sahba Election. In 2005 he received Periyar Award and in 2013, the Tamil Nadu government honoured him with Arignar Anna Award.

References

External links 
 Panruti S. Ramachandran Profile and Biography at Veethi

Tamil Nadu politicians
Living people
1937 births
Tamil Nadu MLAs 2011–2016
Desiya Murpokku Dravida Kazhagam politicians
People from Cuddalore district
All India Anna Dravida Munnetra Kazhagam politicians
Dravida Munnetra Kazhagam politicians
Pattali Makkal Katchi politicians
Tamil Nadu MLAs 1991–1996
Tamil Nadu MLAs 1985–1989